The Tumucumaque Mountains National Park is situated  in the Amazon Rainforest in the Brazilian states of Amapá and Pará. It is bordered to the north by French Guiana and Suriname.

History 
Tumucumaque was declared a national park on August 23, 2002, by the Government of Brazil, after collaboration with the WWF. 
It is part of the Amapá Biodiversity Corridor, created in 2003.
The conservation unit is supported by the Amazon Region Protected Areas Program. Its Management Plan was published on March 10, 2010.

Geography 
This area even reaches  when including the bordering Guiana Amazonian Park, a national park in French Guiana. 

But the latter is certainly smaller if the Tumucumaque Mountains National Park (Brazil) and the adjacent Guiana Amazonian Park (France) is combined with large neighbouring protected areas in northern Pará, Brazil, such as Grão-Pará Ecological Station, Maicuru Biological Reserve, and many others. The importance is that this makes the Guiana Shield one of the best protected and largest ecological corridor of tropical rainforests in the world. It is an uninhabited region and is of high ecological value: most of its animal species, mainly fish and aquatic birds, are not found in any other place in the world. 
It is a habitat for jaguars, primates, aquatic turtles, and harpy eagles.

The highest point of the Brazilian state of Amapá is located there, reaching 701 meters.

Climate 
The climate is tropical monsoon (Köppen: Am), common in areas of northern Brazil in transition from biomes to the Amazon Forest. It has an average temperature of 25 °C (77 °F) and accumulated rainfall ranging from 2,000 (7.87 in) to 3,250 mm (127.95 in) per year.

Tourism 
Tourism in the Park takes place in two different sectors: Amapari Sector and Oiapoque Sector.

At Amaparí Sector, the Park is accessed by Serra do Navio city (most common) or by a community in Pedra Branca do Amapari (usually in the summer). The trip is made by the Amapari River, using aluminum boats (90 km from Serra do Navio) to the park's rustic base, where it is possible to stay in a camping structure adapted to Amazonian conditions (hammocks) and do activities such as trails, bathing in rivers and animal and plants watching.

At Oiapoque Sector, you can camp at Cachoeira do Anotaie, which is located on the Anotaie River, a tributary of the Oiapoque River. This waterfall is 40 km from the city of Oiapoque, on a trip using aluminum boats. There is also the possibility to visit Vila Brasil, a community located on the right bank of the Oiapoque River and located in front of the French-Guyanese indigenous community of Camopi. In this location there are small hotels and it is possible to understand its socio-cultural context, where the residents, mostly traders, provide services to the indigenous people of the neighboring country.

Legacy 
Mozilla Firefox code-named the beta of Firefox 4 Tumucumaque.

Notes

References

Sources

External links 
Amazon natives use Google Earth, GPS to protect rainforest home
Conservation International - Mountains of Tumucumaque Mountains National Park: Setting a New Conservation Standard

2002 establishments in Brazil
National parks of Brazil
Protected areas of Amapá
Guianan savanna